The legendary early Chola kings are recorded history of early Chola rulers of Sangam period in Tamil literature and Sangam literature. The other source of early Chola history is found in the inscriptions left by later Chola kings.

Sources of early Chola history 

The genealogy of the Chola kings as found in Tamil literature and in the many inscriptions left by the later Chola kings. It contain records of kings for whom no verifiable historic evidence survives. Many versions of this lineage exist. The main source is the Sangam literature – particularly, religious literature such as Periyapuranam, semi-biographical poems of the later Chola period such as the temple and cave inscriptions and left by medieval Cholas.

Irrespective of the source, no list of the kings has a strong evidentiary basis and, while they generally are similar to each other, no two lists are identical. Some historians consider these lists as comprehensive conglomerations of various Hindu deities and Puranic characters attributed to local chieftains and invented ancestry of dynasty attempting to re-establish their legitimacy and supremacy in a land they were trying to conquer.

Origin of Cholas and Literary sources 

Typical hero and demi-gods found their place in the ancestry claimed by the later Cholas in the genealogies incorporated into the copper-plate charters and stone inscription of the tenth and eleventh centuries. The earliest version of this is found in the Kilbil Plates which give fifteen names before Chola including the genuinely historical ones of Karikala, Perunarkilli and Kocengannan. The Thiruvalangadu Plates swells this list to forty-four, and the Kanya Plates lists fifty-two.

The Cholas were looked upon as descended from the Solar dynasty. The Puranas speak of a Chola king, a supposed contemporary of the sage Agastya, whose devotion brought the river Kavery into existence.

The story of king Manu Needhi Cholan tells of how he sentenced his son to death for having accidentally killed a calf. He was called thus because he followed the rules of Manu; his real name is not mentioned and is thought to be "Ellalan" according to Maha vamsam who was attributed with a similar story. King Shibi rescued a dove from a hunter by giving his own flesh to the hungry and poor hunter and was also part of the legends. King Shivi was also called Sembiyan, a popular title assumed by a number of Chola kings.

Sangam period Chola rulers 

The Chola kings of the Sangam period and the life of people contributed much to Tamil cultural wealth. The Sangam literature is full of legends about Chola kings. However, no evidentiary basis supports this list of Kings either by way of inscriptions or by way of literary evidence (even in Sangam literature). The dates of accession are approximate interpolation of the Chronological standpoints in Tamil history.

List of Sangam Chola rulers till 250s CE–

Genealogy from Chola inscriptions 

The genealogy of the Chola family conveyed by the Thiruvalangadu copperplate grant consists of names that corroborate the historic authenticity of legends.

 Manu
 Ikshvaku
 Vikukshi
 Puranjaya
 Kakutstha
 Kakshivat
 Aryaman
 Analapratapa
 Vena
 Prithu
 Dhundhumara
 Yuvanasva
 Mandhata
 Muchukunda
 Valabha
 Prithulaksha
 Parthivachudamani
 Dirghabahu
 Chandrajit
 Sankriti
 Panchapa
 Satyavrata
 Rudrajit
 Sibi
 Marutta
 Dushyanta
 Bharata
 Cholavarman
 Rajakesarivarman
 Parakesarin
 Chitraratha
 Chitrasva
 Chitradhanvan
 Suraguru (Mrityujit)
 Chitraratha
 Vyaghraketu
 Narendrapati
 Vasu (Uparichara)
 Visvajit
 Perunatkilli
 Karikala
 Kochchengannan

See also 
 Tamilakam
 Chola Empire
 History of India
 List of Tamil monarchs
 History of Tamil Nadu
 History of South India
 Timeline of Indian history
 Chronology of Tamil history

References

Chola dynasty
Empires and kingdoms of India
Dynasties of India
Chola
Hindu dynasties
Tamilakam
Tamil empires and kingdoms
Chola kings